The AIDSRides were a series of fundraising events organised by Pallotta TeamWorks which raised more than $105 million for critical AIDS services and medical research. About half of the money raised directly benefited AIDS patients.

In 2001, the San Francisco AIDS Foundation and the Los Angeles Gay and Lesbian Center ended their partnership with the California AIDSRide over concerns that not enough money was going to the charities. They hired Honeycutt Group, a consulting firm started by three former Pallotta TeamWorks employees, to organize AIDS/LifeCycle, a similar event. Dan Pallotta unsuccessfully sued the "copycat" event, but the competition and surrounding controversy made 2002 the event's last year.

Ride list
Pallotta TeamWorks has organised several AIDSRides in North America:

 California: 1994–2002
 Boston>New York, 1994–2002
 Philadelphia to DC: Philadelphia, Pennsylvania, to Washington, D.C., 1996  TeamWorks was fined by Pennsylvania Attorney General for improper fund raising.
Florida AIDS Ride from Orlando to Miami (South Beach) 1996-97
 Washington, D.C. AIDS Ride (NC to D.C.) 1997–2002
 Heartland: Twin Cities to Chicago, 1996–2002
 Northeast: New York to Boston, or reverse, 1995–2002
 Texas: 1998–2002
 Alaska AIDS Vaccine Ride: 2000–2001
 Montana AIDS Vaccine Ride: 2001
 Montreal to Portland, Maine: 2001
 European AIDS Vaccine Ride: 2002

See also
 Positive pedalers
 List of health related charity fundraisers
 AIDS Vaccine 200

References

External links
Charity Treks Montreal to Portland 10th Anniversary ~ 2011
Pallotta TeamWorks and Pallotta TeamWorks history
AIDS/LifeCycle | 7-Day 545 Mile Cycling Event to Support HIV/AIDS Services
Ride for AIDS Chicago | The Midwest's only 2-day, 200-mile cycling Event to Support HIV/AIDS Services
Empire State AIDS Ride
Wisconsin AIDS Ride
New Jersey Ride Against AIDS
Hill Country Ride for AIDS

Health-related fundraisers
Lists of events